3C 35 is a giant radio galaxy with an active galactic nucleus (AGN).  It is classified as a Fanaroff & Riley type II radio galaxy.  It is located in the constellation Cassiopeia.

It is listed as a quasar by the SIMBAD astronomical database.

References

External links
 www.jb.man.ac.uk/atlas/ (J. P. Leahy)
 Wikisky image of 3C 35 (near PGC 4310)

Quasars
035
Cassiopeia (constellation)
035
49.04
4310